The Most Exalted Order of the Crown of the Realm is a Malaysian federal award. It is ranked lower than the Order of the Royal Family of Malaysia.

It should not be confused with the Order of Loyalty to the Crown of Malaysia.

Classes and recipients
It has one rank and is conferred on 30 living recipients only at any time. It is conferred to the Queen of Malaysia and newly appointed Malay rulers in his state. Fifteen, out of the total, are conferred on foreign princes, foreign Heads of State and other distinguished individuals. It does not carry any title.

Insignia
The D.M.N. comprises a collar, a star, and a badge. 
 There are two sheathed kris crossed upright in the centre of the collar.
 The nine-pointed star and the crescent moon of the award are made of gold.
 The badge is a five-pointed star with the jawi verse of Allah on top of the crown, which has a crescent and motto "Berpegang Tegoh Pada Allah" below the crown. (The current spelling of the motto should be "Berpegang Teguh Pada Allah", but amendments of the new spelling is not made)
 The sash is of yellow silk. In the centre are red stripes and the end is tied with a ribbon. The edges of the ribbon have white narrow stripes lying in between two blue stripes. The sash of the order is worn from the left shoulder to the right hip.

The Order was instituted on 16 August 1958 and gazetted on 21 August 1958.

Recipients
Official source

D.M.N.
The recipients do not receive any title. 
 1958: Abdul Rahman, Yang di-Pertuan Besar of Negeri Sembilan
 1958: Abu Bakar, Sultan of Pahang
 1958: Hisamuddin, Sultan of Selangor
 1958: Ibrahim, Sultan of Johor 
 1958: Ibrahim IV, Sultan of Kelantan
 1958: Ismail Nasiruddin, Sultan of Terengganu
 1958: Putra, Raja of Perlis
 1958: Yusuf Izzudin Shah, Sultan of Perak
 1959: Abdul Halim, Sultan of Kedah
 1960: Ismail, Sultan of Johor
 1961: Munawir, Yang di-Pertuan Besar of Negeri Sembilan
 1961: Yahya Petra, Sultan of Kelantan
 1961: Salahuddin, Sultan of Selangor
 1962: Budriah, Raja Permaisuri Agong
 1963: Idris Shah II, Sultan of Perak
 1966: Intan Zaharah, Raja Permaisuri Agong
 1968: Ja'afar, Yang di-Pertuan Besar of Negeri Sembilan
 1970: Tunku Abdul Rahman, Prime Minister of Malaysia
 1971: Bahiyah, Raja Permaisuri Agong
 1974: Ahmad Shah, Sultan of Pahang
 1976: Abdul Razak Hussein, Prime Minister of Malaysia
 1976: Zainab, Raja Permaisuri Agong
 1979: Ismail Petra of Kelantan, Sultan of Kelantan
 1979: Afzan, Raja Permaisuri Agong
 1980: Kurshiah, Raja Permaisuri Agong
 1981: Mahmud, Sultan of Terengganu
 1984: Iskandar, Sultan of Johor
 1984: Zanariah, Raja Permaisuri Agong
 1985: Azlan Shah, Sultan of Perak
 1989: Bainun, Raja Permaisuri Agong
 1994: Najihah, Raja Permaisuri Agong
 1999: Siti Aishah, Raja Permaisuri Agong
 1999: Mizan Zainal Abidin, Sultan of Terengganu
 2001: Sirajuddin, Raja of Perlis
 2001: Fauziah, Raja Permaisuri Agong
 2003: Sharafuddin, Sultan of Selangor
 2007: Nur Zahirah, Raja Permaisuri Agong
 2009: Muhriz, Yang di-Pertuan Besar of Negeri Sembilan
 2011: Muhammad V, Sultan of Kelantan
 2012: Haminah, Raja Permaisuri Agong 
 2014: Nazrin Shah, Sultan of Perak
 2015: Ibrahim Ismail, Sultan of Johor
 2018: Sallehuddin, Sultan of Kedah
 2019: Abdullah, Sultan of Pahang
 2019: Azizah, Raja Permaisuri Agong

Honorary Recipients

D.M.N. (K)
The honorary recipients do not receive any title. 
 1958: Omar Ali Saifuddien III, Sultan of Brunei  
 1959: Carlos P. Garcia, President of the Republic of the Philippines
 1960: Ngo Dinh Diem, President of the Republic of Vietnam
 1962: Ayub Khan, President of the Islamic Republic of Pakistan 
 1962: Bhumibol Adulyadej, King of Thailand 
 1962: Sirikit, Queen consort of Thailand
 1963: Norodom Sihanouk, Head of State of Cambodia
 1964: Norodom Kantol, Prime Minister of Cambodia
 1964: Sisowath Kossamak, Queen Mother of Cambodia
 1964: Hirohito, Emperor of Japan
 1965: Park Chung-hee, President of the Republic of Korea
 1965: Yuk Young-soo, First Lady of the Republic of Korea
 1965: Gamal Abdel Nasser, President of the Arab Republic of Egypt 
 1965: Hussein bin Talal, King of Jordan 
 1965: Tahia Kazem, First Lady the Arab Republic of Egypt
 1967: Wilhelmine Lübke, Spouse of the Federal President of Federal Republic of Germany
 1967: Heinrich Lübke, Federal President of the Federal Republic of Germany
 1968: Haile Selassie, Emperor of Ethiopia
 1968: Imelda Marcos, First Lady of the Republic of the Philippines
 1968: Ferdinand Marcos, President of the Republic of the Philippines
 1968: Mohammad Reza Pahlavi, Emperor of Iran
 1968: Farah Pahlavi, Empress consort of Iran
 1970: Akihito, Crown Prince of Japan
 1970: Michiko, Crown Princess of Japan
 1970: Suharto, President of the Republic of Indonesia
 1970: Siti Hartinah, First Lady of the Republic of Indonesia
 1972: Elizabeth II, Queen of the United Kingdom and the other Commonwealth realms 
 1980: Hassanal Bolkiah, Sultan of Brunei
 1980: Jaber Al-Ahmad Al-Sabah, Emir of Kuwait
 1981: Chun Doo-hwan, President of the Republic of Korea
 1981: Lee Soon-ja, First Lady of the Republic of Korea
 1982: Khalid bin Abdulaziz Al Saud, King of Saudi Arabia
 1982: Nicolae Ceaușescu, President of the Republic of Romania 
 1986: Richard von Weizsäcker, Federal President of the Federal Republic of Germany 
 1986: Marianne von Weizsäcker, Spouse of the Federal President of Federal Republic of Germany
 1988: Roh Tae-woo, President of the Republic of Korea
 1988: Kim Ok-suk, First Lady of the Republic of Korea
 1990: Carlos Andrés Pérez, President of the Bolivarian Republic of Venezuela
 1991: Carlos Salinas de Gortari, President of the United Mexican States
 1991: Carlos Menem, President of the Argentine Republic
 1991: Fernando Collor de Mello, President of the Federative Republic of Brazil
 1991: Qaboos bin Said al Said, Sultan of Oman
 1991: Patricio Aylwin, President of the Republic of Chile
 1995: Eduardo Frei Ruiz-Tagle, President of the Republic of Chile
 1995: Fernando Henrique Cardoso, President of the Federative Republic of Brazil
 1995: Fidel Ramos, President of the Republic of the Philippines
 1995: Juan Carlos, King of Spain
 1995: Martti Ahtisaari, President of the Republic of Finland
 1996: Alberto Fujimori, President of the Republic of Peru
 1996: Carl XVI Gustaf, King of Sweden
 1996: Julio María Sanguinetti, President of the Oriental Republic of Uruguay
 1996: Kim Young-sam, President of the Republic of Korea
 1996: Norodom Monineath, Queen consort of Cambodia
 1997: Aleksander Kwaśniewski, President of the Republic of Poland
 1997: Roman Herzog, Federal President of the Federal Republic of Germany
 1998: Hassan Gouled Aptidon, President of the Republic of Djibouti
 2000: Hamad bin Isa Al Khalifa, King of Bahrain
 2001: Andrés Pastrana Arango, President of the Republic of Colombia
 2001: Fidel Castro, President of the Council of State of Cuba
 2002: Stjepan Mesić, President of the Republic of Croatia
 2003: Carlo Azeglio Ciampi, President of the Italian Republic
 2005: Silvia, Queen consort of Sweden
 2007: Susilo Bambang Yudhoyono, President of the Republic of Indonesia
 2009: Michelle Bachelet, President of the Republic of Chile
 2010: Hamad bin Khalifa Al Thani, Emir of Qatar
 2017: Salman bin Abdulaziz Al Saud, King of Saudi Arabia
 2019: Saleha, Queen consort of Brunei
 2022: Recep Tayyip Erdogan, President of the Republic of Turkey

References

External links
 Malaysia: Most Exalted Order of the Crown of the Realm

Crown of the Realm
Crown of Realm, Most Exalted Order of the
Awards established in 1958
1958 establishments in Malaya